Alesha Football Club is an Indonesian football club from Makassar, South Sulawesi. They currently play in Liga 3. Alesha FC is a club owned by a company PT Alesha Group Perkasa. they have just registered as official members of the Asprov PSSI South Sulawesi in Liga 3 and will debut to compete in 2021 Liga 3 South Sulawesi zone. In addition to having a main squad team, they also have a young squad that competed in the Soeratin Cup, namely Alesha FC U13, Alesha FC U15 and Alesha FC U17.

History
Alesha FC was founded in October 2020 and participated in their inaugural tournament at 2020 Alesha Cup I in Makassar. At that time, the club was divided into 2 teams, namely Alesha FC A and Alesha FC B, they were included in the matches of the 32 participating teams. Alesha FC A became the runner-up while Alesha FC B stopped in the last 8 round.

In early 2021, they are preparing to take part in Liga 3. Various preparations for training and recruitment of selected players have been carried out as well as membership registration and administration to Asprov PSSI South Sulawesi.

Players

Honours
 Liga 3 South Sulawesi
 Runner-up: 2021

References

External links
 

Football clubs in Indonesia
Football clubs in South Sulawesi
Sport in South Sulawesi
Association football clubs established in 2020
2020 establishments in Indonesia